Buchanan Street subway station is a station on the Glasgow Subway in Scotland. It serves Buchanan Street, which is popular with shoppers. Close to Buchanan Bus Station and providing interchange with Glasgow Queen Street railway station via a travelator, it is the busiest station on the Subway, with 2.54 million passengers in the 12 months ending 31 March 2005.

When built in 1896 the station had a single island platform serving both tracks. An additional side platform was added as part of the 1977-1980 modernisation scheme. A glass wall was added on one side of the island platform to prevent access to the train that is boarding at the side platform. Each platform has a single stairway linking it to the ticket hall, causing congestion during peak hours due to conflicting passenger movements in the same space. The station was closed due to the 2002 Glasgow floods.

Other than St Enoch it is the only station with an underground ticket hall, and surface buildings are restricted to new mid-street entrance canopy which was rebuilt in 1999 as part of the repaving of Buchanan Street.   This canopy is constructed entirely of structural glass: all beams and columns, the walls and roof are glass.

Part of carriage 41 from the Subway's pre-1977 rolling stock was preserved within the station.

Nearby places:
Buchanan Galleries
University of Strathclyde

Past passenger numbers 
 2011/12: 2.484 million annually

References 

Glasgow Subway stations
Railway stations in Great Britain opened in 1896
1896 establishments in Scotland